The Orlando Pride is a professional women's soccer team based in Orlando, Florida. The team joined the National Women's Soccer League, the top level of women's soccer in the US, for the 2016 season. It became the tenth team to be added to the league. It is affiliated with the MLS team Orlando City SC and play their home games at Exploria Stadium in downtown Orlando.

History
Following the 2015 NWSL season, it was rumored that the Orlando City SC ownership group would be adding an expansion team to the women's professional league. On October 20, 2015, a press conference was held at Lake Eola Park where Phil Rawlins unveiled the team name, logo, and colors. Former national team head coach of Australia and the U.S. Tom Sermanni was announced as the team's first head coach.

On October 26, 2015, the Pride announced that they had made the first player acquisitions in team history; signing forward Alex Morgan and Kaylyn Kyle from Portland Thorns FC in exchange for the Pride's No. 1 picks in the 2015 NWSL Expansion Draft and the 2016 NWSL College Draft as well as an international roster spot for the 2016 and 2017 seasons, and also acquired Sarah Hagen in a separate trade with FC Kansas City along with Kansas City's second-round 2016 draft pick in exchange for the Pride's 2017 second-round draft pick. They finished the season in 9th.

In 2017 the Pride qualified for the playoffs for the first time in franchise history as they finished the regular season in 3rd place with a record of 11–7–6. They went to Portland Thorns FC for the semi-final but lost 4–1. The season was also notable for the signing of five time FIFA World Player of the Year and Brazil international Marta who finished the season as the league's second highest scorer with 13 goals.

Following a disappointing 2018 season where the Pride missed the playoffs by finishing in 7th place, head coach Tom Sermanni and the Orlando Pride mutually parted ways after three seasons. Sermanni had a regular season record of 25–29–14 during his spell in Orlando, going 0–1–0 in the playoffs.

In January 2019, Marc Skinner stepped down from his role at FA WSL side Birmingham City to become the Pride's second ever head coach.

In May 2019, plans were unveiled to build a dedicated training facility at Sylvan Lake Park, the first-ever training facility in the NWSL that is tailored to and used exclusively by a women's team. The Pride plan to finish out the 2019 season at their current facility located at Seminole Soccer Complex before moving to the new state-of-the art training ground prior to the start of the 2020 season.

On May 12, 2021, Orlando City majority owner Flavio Augusto da Silva announced he was in advanced negotiations with Zygi and Mark Wilf, owners of the Minnesota Vikings of the NFL, for the sale of the club including the Orlando Pride and other related soccer assets. The combined value of the deal was estimated at $400–450 million.

Team name, crest and colors 
The name Orlando Pride was announced on October 20, 2015, by founder and president Phil Rawlins. He noted that the name "captures how we all feel about the City of Orlando, as well as firmly tying into the Lions family." The team colors are purple and light blue. The logo features an illustration of the Linton E. Allen Memorial Fountain at Lake Eola Park.

Uniform evolution 

Home

Away

Stadium 

 The team plays its home games at Exploria Stadium, in Orlando, Florida, which opened for the 2017 NWSL season. The stadium has a 25,500 capacity including a safe standing section. Prior to this the team played the 2016 season at Camping World Stadium.

On April 23, 2016, the Pride set a new NWSL attendance record, achieving a crowd of 23,403 during the Pride's inaugural home game, a 3–1 victory over the Houston Dash at Camping World Stadium. The record stood for over three years before Portland Thorns attracted a post-World Cup attendance of 25,218 in the newly expanded Providence Park in August 2019.

Players

Roster 

Note: Flags indicate national team as defined under FIFA eligibility rules. Players may hold more than one non-FIFA nationality.

Staff

Records

Year-by-year

Head coaches
 
 Only competitive matches are counted. Includes NWSL regular season, playoff and Challenge Cup matches.

Broadcasting 

In 2016, games were broadcast locally on the Bright House Sports Network. In April of the same year, a livestream of a Pride match simulcast on the Facebook page of Alex Morgan had a live audience of 489,999 during the first half. It was the first professional sports broadcast on the social networking website.

For the 2017 season, Orlando Pride games were streamed exclusively by Go90 for American audiences and via the NWSL website for international viewers. As part of a three-year agreement with A&E Networks, Lifetime broadcasts one NWSL Game of the Week on Saturday afternoons. The Pride were featured in the nationally televised Game of the Week on seven occasions. The deal was mutually terminated a year early at the end of the 2018 season.

In 2019, NWSL regular season matches were streamed on Yahoo! Sports for the domestic audience while international fans continued to have access to games for free via the NWSL app and at NWSLsoccer.com. However, on July 4, 2019, NWSL announced it had signed a deal through the second half of the 2019 season with ESPN on the back of the USWNT's World Cup victory. The new deal meant ESPN would televise 11 regular season matches including two Pride games (July 14 and September 11) as well as every playoff game. The sudden switch and lack of information surrounding the international broadcasts led to widespread confusion as ESPN's subscription service ESPN Player took control in Europe, Africa and parts of Asia while Canada's rights were acquired by TSN.

For the 2020 season, the NWSL announced a three-year broadcast deal with CBS Sports and streaming service Twitch. In total, 87 NWSL matches will be shown across the main CBS network, CBS Sports Network, and CBS All Access live-streaming service with 14 of those games televised while Twitch will offer free coverage of 24 selected matches during the 2020 NWSL regular season. Twitch will also serve as the NWSL's exclusive international media rights partner outside the United States in 2020 with all 108 regular-season matches, the playoffs, and Championship available to global viewers.

See also

 List of top-division football clubs in CONCACAF countries
 List of professional sports teams in the United States and Canada

References

External links

 

 
2015 establishments in Florida
Soccer clubs in Florida
Association football clubs established in 2015
National Women's Soccer League teams
Women's soccer clubs in the United States